Ash Lake may refer to:

Cities, towns, townships etc.
Ash Lake Township, Lincoln County, Minnesota

Lakes
Ash Lake (Lincoln County, Minnesota)
Ash Lake (Hubley), a lake in the Halifax Regional Municipality, Nova Scotia
Ash Lake (Clare), a lake of Clare municipality, Nova Scotia
Ash Lake (New Chester), a lake of Guysborough District, Nova Scotia
Ash Lake (St. Mary's),  a lake of Guysborough District, Nova Scotia
Ash Lake (Timberlea), a lake in the Halifax Regional Municipality, Nova Scotia
Ash Lake (Upper Tantallon), a lake in the Halifax Regional Municipality, Nova Scotia
Ash Lake (Vancouver Island), a lake on Vancouver Island, British Columbia
Ash Lake (Wellington), a lake in the Halifax Regional Municipality, Nova Scotia